Baccha Shoshur is an 2019 Indian Bengali  comedy-drama film directed by Biswarup Biswas. Written by Pavel, the film features Jeet, Koushani Mukherjee, Aman Mehra and Chiranjit Chakraborty along with Biswarup Biswas in the leading roles. The film was released on 8 February 2019.

Plot  
Spondan Islam (Jeet) sees his father-in-law in his son. Soon after, chaos arises. Spondan brings his son to a woman to try exorcism. When his wife Jonaki (Koushani Mukherjee) learns about this, she is convinced that Spondan is mentally unstable, so Jonaki is forced to keep Spondan in mental hospital.

Cast
 Jeet as Spondan Islam/Spidey (dual role)
 Koushani Mukherjee as Jonaki
 Aman Mehra
 Chiranjit Chakraborty
 Biswarup Biswas
 Urmimala Basu
 Ambarish Bhattacharya
 Kushal Chakraborty
 Anamika Saha
 Jagannath Basu as Pratul

Production  
The film was announced by Surinder Films and Jeet through their respective Twitter handles with the release of the first poster on 24 December 2018 on the eve of Christmas. It was touted that Pavel would be directing the film but the film's first poster created confusion which got cleared when it was announced that though Pavel had written the screenplay and dialogues for the film, his assistant Biswarup Biswas would be directing it.

Soundtrack

References

External links
 

2019 films
Indian comedy-drama films
2019 comedy-drama films
Bengali-language Indian films
2010s Bengali-language films